Margaret Orr is the chief meteorologist for WDSU in New Orleans.

Career
A graduate of Louisiana State University and a certificate holder from the meteorology program at Mississippi State University, Orr had a fascination with weather ever since Hurricane Betsy hit New Orleans in 1965. She started her weather forecasting career in Charleston, South Carolina but returned home to New Orleans in July 1979, when she joined WDSU, and she has remained there ever since. She co-hosted Breakfast Edition and also co-hosted World's Fair Show during the 1984 Louisiana World Exposition. In 2009, she was promoted to chief meteorologist after the semi-retirement of Dan Milham. She is heavily involved in tracking hurricanes.

She holds a seal of approval from the American Meteorological Society and the National Weather Association.

Personal life
Orr grew up in New Orleans where she attended Louise S. McGehee High School graduating in 1971, and later attended and graduated from Louisiana State University in nearby Baton Rouge, while being a member of Kappa Alpha Theta. She is married with three children and a dog named Bleu.

Notes

External links
Biography on the WDSU site
Margaret Orr on Twitter

Living people
American television meteorologists
Television anchors from New Orleans
Year of birth missing (living people)